Results from Norwegian football in 1920.

Class A of local Association Leagues
Class A of local association leagues (kretsserier) is the predecessor of a national league competition. From 1920 the local association boundaries closely follows those of the counties in Norway.

Norwegian Cup

First round

|}

Second round

|}

Third round

|colspan="3" style="background-color:#97DEFF"|19 September 1920

Quarter-finals

|colspan="3" style="background-color:#97DEFF"|3 October 1920

Semi-finals

|colspan="3" style="background-color:#97DEFF"|10 October 1920

Final

National team

Sources:

References

External links
 RSSSF Norway

 
Seasons in Norwegian football